Hands of Time may refer to:

Hands of Time (album), a 1991 album by Kingdom Come
"The Hands of Time", a song by Stratovarius from the 1992 album Twilight Time
"Hands of Time", a 2002 song by Groove Armada from Lovebox
"Hands of Time", a 2016 single by Margo Price from Midwest Farmer's Daughter
Ninjago: Hands of Time, the seventh season in the Ninjago: Masters of Spinjitzu computer-animated television series
"The Hands of Time", a theme from the film Brian's Song
Hands of Time, a 2001 video game published by Titus Interactive for the Game Boy Color